Kartitsch is a municipality in the district of Lienz in the Austrian state of Tyrol.

Geography
Kartitsch lies on both sides of the Gail River, near its confluence with the Puster Valley. The municipal area of Kartitsch is bounded in the north of the western foothills of the Lienzer Dolomites and to the south of the Carnic Alps, which contains the border with Italy. The municipality contains villages, such as Sankt Oswald. It lies near other Austrian municipalities, such as Abfaltersbach, Anras, Heinfels, Obertilliach, Sillian, and Strassen.

Population

Coat of arms
The coat of arms of the Kartitsch is a rising golden crescent on a blue field. In 1465, the Frederick III, Holy Roman Emperor, awarded the coat of arms to Hans and Jacob Wiser, leading men of the municipality.

Tourism
Both tourism and agriculture form the basis of the local economy. In 2003, Kartitsch had 84,000 visitor-nights. Local points of interest include:
The Parish Church of St. Leonhard: a Gothic church completed in 1479, with a high altar from the years 1761–1763.
The 'Our Lady' Church: built in 1680 to 1685, one of the notable early Baroque churches in the area. The stucco frames came from the workshop of Gallus Apeller in Innsbruck. The Church is located in Hollbruck.

References

External links

Cities and towns in Lienz District